Wangs is an unincorporated community in Warsaw Township, Goodhue County, Minnesota, United States, near Dennison.

References

Unincorporated communities in Minnesota
Unincorporated communities in Goodhue County, Minnesota